The Harford County Sheriff's Office (HCSO) is the second largest sheriff's office in Maryland and is the primary law enforcement agency servicing a population of 241,402 persons within  within Harford County, MD.

History
The HCSO was created on March 22, 1774 after an act of the Maryland General Assembly in 1773 as Baltimore County was divided in half creating the new county of Harford. Thomas Miller was appointed the first Sheriff by the Lord Proprietor of the Province, Henry Harford (the county's namesake). Although initially appointed, all subsequent Sheriffs were elected to two-year terms until 1914 when the term was extended to four years.

In 2016, the Sheriff's Office joined ICE's 287(g) program.

In 2022, Harford County deputies fatally shot a suicidal man: under state law, police killings must be investigated by the state attorney general's office. The attorney general stated that Sheriff Jeffrey Gahler was impeding the investigation, and was eventually forced to obtain a restraining order against him so the investigation could continue.

Organization
The current Sheriff is Jeff Gahler. The HCSO employs over 500 sworn and civilian support staff and has three basic duties: general law enforcement, court-order enforcement, and correctional services. The HCSO also has a myriad of special operations such as K-9, SWAT, and Accident Investigation among others.

In 2013, the Sheriff's office opened an aviation unit with the granting of a Bell OH-58 helicopter. In 2015 the aviation program was discontinued.

Rank Structure and Insignia

See also 

 List of law enforcement agencies in Maryland

References

External links
HCSO official homepage
Harford County Government official website

Sheriff's Office
Sheriffs' offices of Maryland
1774 establishments in Maryland